General elections were held in Sweden between 19 and 21 September 1924. The Swedish Social Democratic Party remained the largest party, winning 104 of the 230 seats in the Second Chamber of the Riksdag.

Results

Aftermath
After the election the Cabinet of Ernst Trygger resigned and Gustav V asked Hjalmar Branting to form a new Cabinet which the Social Democratic leader accepted.

References

General elections in Sweden
Sweden
General
Sweden